Plantsville is an unincorporated community in Morgan County, in the U.S. state of Ohio.

History
A post office called Plantsville was established in 1888, and remained in operation until 1908.

References

Unincorporated communities in Morgan County, Ohio
Unincorporated communities in Ohio
1888 establishments in Ohio
Populated places established in 1888